Vanadzor State University named after Hovhannes Tumanyan (VSU), is a public university in Vanadzor, Lori Province, Armenia. With 5 faculties, it is the largest university in the Lori Province. It provides degrees in Philology, History and Geography, Pedagogy, Biology and Chemistry, and Physics and Mathematics. Currently, more than 2,400 students are attending the university.

Overview
Originally, the Faculty of Pedagogy in Vanadzor was founded on 9 July 1969 as part of the Armenian State Pedagogical University. In 1982, the Faculty of Physics and Mathematics of the Yerevan State University-Vanadzor branch was opened.

On 30 April 2014, by the decision of the Government of Armenia, the educational institutions of Vanadzor were restructured to form the Vanadzor State University named after Hovhannes Tumanyan.

The current rector of the university is Rostom Sahakyan.

Faculties
Currently, the university has the following structure:
Faculty of Philology
Section of Armenian Language
Section of Literature
Section of Russian Language
Section of Foreign Languages
Faculty of History and Geography
Section of History
Section of Philosophy and Political Science
Section of the Theory of Economics
Faculty of Pedagogy
Section of Pedagogy
Section of Psychology and Sociology
Section of Art
Faculty of Biology and Chemistry
Section of Biology, Physiology and Medical Science
Section of Chemistry
Section of PE Theory and Methodology
Faculty of Physics and Mathematics
Section of Physics
Section of Mathematics and Methodology
Section of IT and Economical Methods and Modeling

Notable alumni
Tovmas Poghosyan (1954-), prominent Armenia folk music performer.

References

Universities in Armenia
Educational institutions established in 1969
1969 establishments in Armenia